The Women's giant slalom competition of the Grenoble 1968 Olympics was held at Chamrousse.

The defending world champion was Marielle Goitschel of France, while Canada's Nancy Greene was the defending World Cup giant slalom champion, who also led the current season, along with Switzerland's Fernande Bochatay.

Results

References 

Women's giant slalom
Alp
Oly